Tonibler is a male given name in Kosovo, given in honour of former British Prime Minister Tony Blair following his role in the 1999 NATO air campaign against the Federal Republic of Yugoslavia during the Kosovo War. Blair was credited as being instrumental in ending the conflict, and boys born following the war were sometimes given the name Toni or Tonibler.

In 2010, Blair made a visit to Kosovo where he met several boys bearing the name.

References

External links

Little Tony Blairs of Kosovo: the boys named after the 'great man' – video (The Guardian)

Masculine given names
Albanian masculine given names
Kosovan culture
Tony Blair